The Future Party (GP) is a political party in Turkey formed by former Prime Minister Ahmet Davutoğlu. The party was formally founded on 12 December 2019, in opposition to the ruling Justice and Development Party.

History

Formation
The Future Party was founded on 12 December 2019 by Ahmet Davutoğlu, a former foreign minister and prime minister on behalf of the conservative Justice and Development Party (AKP). Having been elected prime minister on 28 August 2014 with the support of President Recep Tayyip Erdoğan, Davutoğlu later opposed the latter's moves to transform Turkey's form of government from a parliamentary to a presidential system. His conflict with Erdoğan culminated in Davutoğlu's resignation from the premiership, effective from 22 May 2016.

Following his resignation, Davutoğlu frequently criticized the AKP government, which led the party to launch disciplinary actions against him. In response, he resigned from the AKP on 13 September 2019. He later expressed interest in forming a new party in opposition to President Erdoğan's administration, and ultimately launched the Future Party on 12 December 2019. The new party immediately published a list of 154 founding members which included numerous former AKP officials and affiliates.

Policies

Davutoğlu has stated that the new party would push for a new constitution, a return to a parliamentary system, and education in minority languages. Moreover, the manifesto of the party criticized the current lack of rights for the Kurdish minority.

See also 
 List of political parties in Turkey

References

External links
Official website
Twitter account

Liberal conservative parties in Turkey
Organizations based in Ankara
Political parties in Turkey
Political parties established in 2019
2019 establishments in Turkey